HMS Samphire was a  that served in the Royal Navy.

She was built by Smiths Dock Company, in South Bank-on-Tees, and was commissioned into the Royal Navy on 30 June 1941.

Wartime service
Samphire was assigned to the 36th Escort Group and tasked with convoy escort operations between Liverpool and the Mediterranean Sea. On 21 December 1941, she successfully released depth charges with the British sloop  resulting in the sinking of the German submarine  in the North Atlantic northeast of the Azores. All 47 men on board the U-567 were killed. On 8 November 1942, she escorted  from the Mediterranean after she had been attacked by German aircraft, which hit the Leedstown with an aerial torpedo in the stern the day earlier.

Sinking
Samphire was torpedoed and sunk on 30 January 1943 off Bougie, Algeria by the Italian submarine .  Samphire was escorting convoy TE-14 which was taking part in the North African campaign.  The captain, two officers and 42 of the ship’s crew perished.

References

External links
 HMS Samphire on the Arnold Hague database at convoyweb.org.uk.

 

Flower-class corvettes of the Royal Navy
Ships sunk by Italian submarines
World War II shipwrecks in the Mediterranean Sea
1941 ships
Ships built on the River Tees
Maritime incidents in January 1943